María José Mariscal (born November 24, 2005), is a Mexican actress.

Career 
Mariscal studied at the Center for Arts Education (CEA) of Televisa. She started as an actress in the TV program La voz dormida in 2011. In 2012, she received her first lead role in Juan Osorio's telenovela Porque el amor manda, where she played Valentina. In 2013, Mariscal participated as a recurring role in the soap opera Por siempre mi amor, where she played child Marianela. In 2015, she appeared as Sarahi, the daughter of Jorge Salinas friend, for only fifty episodes of the series Mi corazón es tuyo.
In 2016, she worked with Osorio and his son, Emilio, for a third a time in the telenovela Sueño de amor.

Filmography

See also 
Isabella Tena

References

External links 

Mexican actresses
Mexican child actresses
Living people
Actresses from Mexico City
2005 births